The 1927 Cork Senior Hurling Championship was the 39th staging of the Cork Senior Hurling Championship since its establishment by the Cork County Board in 1887. The draw for the opening round fixtures took place on 23 February 1927. The championship began on 27 March 1927 and ended on 27 November 1927.

St. Finbarr’s were the defending champions.

On 27 November 1927, Blackrock won the championship following a 5-5 to 2-1 defeat of Redmonds in the final. This was their 18th championship title overall and their first title in two championship seasons.

Team changes

To Championship

Promoted from the Cork Intermediate Hurling Championship
 Kinsale

Results

First round

Redmonds received a bye in this round.

Second round

Semi-finals

Final

Miscellaneous

  Redmonds qualify for the final for the last time.

References

Cork Senior Hurling Championship
Cork Senior Hurling Championship